At the Strasbourg is a 1934 German comedy film directed by Franz Osten and starring Hans Stüwe, Ursula Grabley, and Anna von Palen.

The film's sets were designed by the art directors Kurt Dürnhöfer and Max Knaake. Location filming took place in Strasbourg and Switzerland.

Cast

References

Bibliography

External links 
 

1934 films
Films of Nazi Germany
German comedy films
1934 comedy films
1930s German-language films
Films directed by Franz Osten
German black-and-white films
1930s German films